Bartling is a surname that may refer to
Charlie Bartling (1912–1998), Australian rules football player
Doby Bartling (1913–1992), American football player and coach
Friedrich Gottlieb Bartling (1798–1875), German botanist
Irv Bartling (1914–1973), American baseball infielder
James C. Bartling (1819–1906), Canadian sailor, merchant and politician
Julie Bartling (born 1958), American politician
Seth M. Bartling (1886–1954), Canadian politician